Cornell George Hopley Woolrich (December 4, 1903 – September 25, 1968) was an American novelist and short story writer. He sometimes used the pseudonyms William Irish and George Hopley.

His biographer, Francis Nevins Jr., rated Woolrich the fourth best crime writer of his day, behind Dashiell Hammett, Erle Stanley Gardner and Raymond Chandler.

Biography
Woolrich was born in New York City.  His parents separated when he was young, and he lived for a time in Mexico with his father before returning to New York to live with his mother, Claire Attalie Woolrich.

He attended Columbia University but left in 1926 without graduating when his first novel, Cover Charge, was published. As Eddie Duggan observes, "Woolrich enrolled at New York's Columbia University in 1921 where he spent a relatively undistinguished year until he was taken ill and was laid up for some weeks. It was during this illness (a Rear-Window-like confinement involving a gangrenous foot, according to one version of the story) that Woolrich started writing, producing Cover Charge, which was published in 1926."  Cover Charge was one of his Jazz Age novels inspired by the work of F. Scott Fitzgerald. A second short story, Children of the Ritz, won Woolrich the first prize of $10,000 the following year in a competition organised by College Humor and First National Pictures; this led to his working as a screenwriter in Hollywood for First National Pictures. While in Hollywood, Woolrich explored his sexuality, apparently engaging in what Frances M. Nevins Jr. describes as "promiscuous and clandestine homosexual activity" and by marrying Violet Virginia Blackton, the 21-year-old daughter of J. Stuart Blackton, one of the founders of the Vitagraph studio. Failing in both his attempt at marriage and at establishing a career as a screenwriter (the unconsummated marriage was annulled in 1933; Woolrich garnered no screen credits), Woolrich sought to resume his life as a novelist:

When he turned to pulp and detective fiction, Woolrich's output was so prolific his work was often published under one of his many pseudonyms. For example, "William Irish" was the byline in Dime Detective Magazine (February 1942) on his 1942 story "It Had to Be Murder", source of the 1954 Alfred Hitchcock movie Rear Window and itself based on H.G. Wells' short story "Through a Window". François Truffaut filmed Woolrich's The Bride Wore Black and Waltz into Darkness in 1968 and 1969, respectively, the latter as Mississippi Mermaid. Ownership of the copyright in Woolrich's original story "It Had to Be Murder" and its use for Rear Window was litigated before the US Supreme Court in Stewart v. Abend, 495 U.S. 207 (1990).

He returned to New York where he and his mother moved into the Hotel Marseilles (Broadway and West 103rd Street in Upper West Side Manhattan near Columbia University). Eddie Duggan observes that "[a]lthough his writing made him wealthy, Woolrich and his mother lived in a series of seedy hotel rooms, including the squalid Hotel Marseilles apartment building in Harlem, among a group of thieves, prostitutes and lowlifes that would not be out of place in Woolrich's dark fictional world." Woolrich lived there until his mother's death on October 6, 1957, which prompted his move to the slightly upscale Hotel Franconia (20 West 72nd Street near Central Park). Duggan wrote:
 
In later years, he socialized on occasion in Manhattan bars with Mystery Writers of America colleagues and younger fans such as writer Ron Goulart. He moved later to the Sheraton-Russell on Park Avenue and became a virtual recluse. In his 60s, with his eyesight failing, lonely, wracked by guilt over his homosexuality, tortured by self-doubt, alcoholic and a diabetic, Woolrich neglected himself to such a degree that he allowed a foot infection to become gangrenous which resulted, early in 1968, in the amputation of a leg.

After the amputation and a conversion to Catholicism, Woolrich returned to the Sheraton-Russell, requiring the use of a wheelchair. Some of the staff there would take Woolrich down to the lobby so he could look out on the passing traffic.

Woolrich did not attend the premiere of Truffaut's film of his novel The Bride Wore Black in 1968, even though it was held in New York City. He died weighing 89 pounds and was interred with his mother in the "Shrine of Memories Mausoleum", Unit 1, Tier G, Crypt 102 at Ferncliff Cemetery, Hartsdale, New York.

Woolrich bequeathed his estate of about $850,000 to Columbia University to endow scholarships in his mother's memory for writing students. His papers are also kept at the Columbia University Libraries.

Bibliography
Most of Woolrich's books are out of print, and new editions were slow to come out because of estate issues. However, new collections of his short stories were issued in the early 1990s. As of February 3, 2020, the Faded Page has seven titles available as ebooks in the public domain in Canada; these may be still under copyright elsewhere. In 2020 and 2021, Otto Penzler's "American Mystery Classics" series released new editions of Waltz into Darkness and The Bride Wore Black in both hardcover and paperback.

Woolrich died leaving fragments of an unfinished novel, titled The Loser; fragments have been published separately and also collected in Tonight, Somewhere in New York (2005).

Novels

Short story collections

Selected films based on Woolrich stories
 Convicted (1938) (story Face Work), directed by Leon Barsha
 Street of Chance (1942) (novel The Black Curtain), directed by Jack Hively
 The Leopard Man (1943) (novel Black Alibi), directed by Jacques Tourneur
 Phantom Lady (1944) (novel), directed by Robert Siodmak
 The Mark of the Whistler (1944) (story Dormant Account), directed by William Castle
 Deadline at Dawn (1946) (novel), the only film directed by stage director Harold Clurman
 Black Angel (1946) (novel), directed by Roy William Neill
 The Chase (1946) (novel The Black Path of Fear). directed by Arthur Ripley
 Fall Guy (1947) (story Cocaine), directed by Reginald Le Borg
 The Guilty (1947) (story He Looked Like Murder), directed by John Reinhardt
 Fear in the Night (1947) (story Nightmare), directed by Maxwell Shane
 The Return of the Whistler (1948) (story All at Once, No Alice), directed by D. Ross Lederman
 I Wouldn't Be in Your Shoes (1948) (story), directed by William Nigh
 Night Has a Thousand Eyes (1948) (novel), directed by John Farrow
 The Window (1949) (story The Boy Cried Murder), directed by Ted Tetzlaff
 No Man of Her Own (1950) (novel I Married a Dead Man), directed by Mitchell Leisen
 The Earring (1951) (story The Death Stone), directed by León Klimovsky
 The Trace of Some Lips (1952) (story Collared), directed by Juan Bustillo Oro
 If I Should Die Before I Wake (1952), directed by Carlos Hugo Christensen
 Don't Ever Open That Door (1952) (stories Somebody on the Phone and Humming Bird Comes Home) directed by Carlos Hugo Christensen
 Rear Window (1954) (story It Had to Be Murder), directed by Alfred Hitchcock
 Obsession (1954) (story Silent as the Grave), directed by Jean Delannoy
 The Glass Eye (1956), directed by Antonio Santillán
 Nightmare (1956) (story), directed by Maxwell Shane
 Escapade (1957) (story Cinderella and the Mob), directed by Ralph Habib
 Ah, Bomb! (1964) (story Adventures of a Fountain Pen), directed by Kihachi Okamoto
 The Boy Cried Murder (1966) (story The Boy Cried Murder), directed by George P. Breakston
 The Bride Wore Black (1968) (novel), directed by François Truffaut
 Mississippi Mermaid  (1969) (novel Waltz into Darkness), directed by François Truffaut
 Kati Patang (1970) (novel I Married a Dead Man), directed by Shakti Samanta
 Seven Blood-Stained Orchids (1972) (novel Rendezvous in Black), directed by Umberto Lenzi
 You'll Never See Me Again (1973), filmed for television, directed by Jeannot Szwarc
 Martha (1974) (story For the Rest of Her Life), directed by Rainer Werner Fassbinder
 Gun Moll (1975) (story Collared), directed by Giorgio Capitani
 Union City (1980) (story The Corpse Next Door), directed by Marcus Reichert
 I Married a Shadow (1983) (novel I Married a Dead Man)
 Cloak & Dagger (1984) (story The Boy Who Cried Murder), directed by Richard Franklin
 I'm Dangerous Tonight (1990) (story I'm Dangerous Tonight), directed by Tobe Hooper
 Mrs. Winterbourne (1996) (novel I Married a Dead Man), directed by Richard Benjamin
 Rear Window (1998) (story It Had to Be Murder), directed by Jeff Bleckner
 Original Sin (2001) (novel Waltz into Darkness), directed by Michael Cristofer
 Four O'Clock (2006) (story Three O'Clock)

References

Sources
 Nevins, Francis M. Jr. (1988), First You Dream, Then You Die, Mysterious Press.
 Duggan, E. (1999) 'Writing in the darkness: the world of Cornell Woolrich' CrimeTime 2.6 pp. 113–126.

Further reading
 Breen, Jon L. "Dark Deeds: The Mystery of Cornell Woolrich." The Weekly Standard (March 8, 2004), 31–33.
 Lane, Joel. "Mansions of Fear: The Dark Houses of Cornell Woolrich". Wormwood No 3 (Autumn 2004), 22–32.
 Phelps, Donald. "Cinema Gris: Woolrich/Neil's Black Angel." Film Comment Vol. 36 No. 1 (Jan–Feb 2000), 64–69.
 Rosenbaum, Jonathan. "Black Window: Cornell Woolrich." Film Comment Vol. 20 No. 5 (Sept–Oct 1984), 36–38.
 Thompson, Currie K. "Two Takes on Gender in Argentine Film Noir." Studies in Hispanic Cinemas Vol. 4 No. 2 (2007), 121–130. (analyzes Si muero antes de despertar/If I Should Die Before I Wake [1952], based on a Cornell Woolrich story)

External links
 
 
  Radio adaptations of Cornell Woolrich's stories on the CBS radio show Suspense
 
 Cornell Woolrich Papers at the Columbia University Rare Book and Manuscript Library, New York
 "Cornell Woolrich and the Tough-Man Tradition of American Crime Fiction" by Christine Photinos (Clues: A Journal of Detection 28.2, 2010)
 "The melodrama star as a noir film heroine: The Trace of Some Lips (1952)" by Roberto Carlos Ortiz (article in Spanish about a Mexican adaptation of "Collared", by Cornell Woolrich)
 Finding aid to Cornell Woolrich papers at Columbia University. Rare Book & Manuscript Library.

1903 births
1968 deaths
Writers from New York City
American amputees
American male novelists
American mystery writers
Burials at Ferncliff Cemetery
Columbia College (New York) alumni
Edgar Award winners
American LGBT novelists
20th-century American novelists
American short story writers
American male short story writers
20th-century American short story writers
20th-century American male writers
Novelists from New York (state)
American Noir writers
20th-century pseudonymous writers
20th-century American LGBT people